Marvel Super Heroes: The Heroic Role-Playing Game is a role-playing game boxed set published by TSR in 1984 for the Marvel Super Heroes role-playing game, and was the debut product for the game.

Contents
Marvel Super Heroes: The Heroic Role-Playing Game is a boxed set detailing a superhero role-playing system based on the characters and universe of Marvel Comics.  The very simple, introductory rules use one "Universal Table" to determine success of all actions. A round is defined as 'one panel in a comic book' rather than as a specific period of time. A universal table, coupled with a simple battle effects table, is used for dice resolution.

The Battle Book (16 pages) is primarily intended as a simplified introduction to the game. The book covers combat, which is position-oriented. as well as the basic rules of the game, including characteristics, and how to perform basic feats and fight stats. It demonstrates the seven main characteristics (Fighting, Agility, Strength, Endurance, Reason, Intuition, and Psyche) plus the four variable characteristics: Health (hit points), Karma, Resources (such as money) and Popularity. It also emphasises that all of these statistics vary throughout the game. The value of each characteristic is rated on a scale of 11 grades ranging from "Feeble" (subhuman) to "Good" and "Amazing" to "Class 1000" which is incomprehensibly powerful and unattainable by players. Powers and skills are rated on the same scale and their use is regulated by a dice roll. These are emphasised on the back cover of both game books. Dice rolls can also be altered by expending Karma which can be recovered by performing good deeds or fulfilling obligations. Karma can also be removed from the player by misdeeds, crimes, and other mistakes. "Super-villains" earn Karma by committing crimes or defeating and humiliating opponents.

The "Campaign Book" (48 pages) covers characters (including a sample character creation sequence), vehicles and equipment, and information on how to run a campaign. The Campaign Book deals with character generation, the nature and use of powers, and the design and proper use of equipment. The Campaign Book provides several examples for each character characteristic and rank. The Campaign book suggests two methods for character generation: a purely random system, and a free-choice system in which the player selects characters levels, powers and skills, and then submits them to the referee for approval and modification to appropriate levels for the campaign or scenario. As the game progresses, Karma points may be saved in "pools" to buy or improve characteristics and powers. These points must be allocated to a specific purpose before they are saved. Bad Karma losses can wipe out accumulated pools before they can be spent.

"Day of the Octopus" (16 pages) is a sample scenario, with statistics for eight Marvel heroes and villains. "Day of the Octopus" pits Captain America, Spider-Man, Captain Marvel, and the Thing against several supervillains led by Doctor Octopus. There are six chapters, each consisting of campaign developments and descriptions of the various settings, characters and weapons involved in combat; most which require the use of the large map in the game box.

The other game components are aids to the players and the referee. The "character records" cover the Fantastic Four, Spider-Man (the "host" who explains most of the rules), Wolverine, Captain Marvel, and Captain America. Each card has a color picture of the character on the glossy (front) side, and a personal and game detail overleaf on the rear of the card. The counters are large and marked with an arrow to indicate the location of the character or object they represent when placed on the game map. All the superhero and supervillain counters illustrate the character's secret identity on one side, and the super identity on the other. The map shows a few blocks of a generic city on one side, and interior details of a few buildings on the other.

Publication history
TSR produced the game under license from Marvel. Under Kevin and Brian Blume, TSR had been in tight competition for a license to Marvel Comics superheroes in the early 1980s; other contenders for the license included companies such as Fantasy Games Unlimited, Games Workshop and Mayfair Games. TSR was ultimately able to prevail because of their top position in the industry and their pre-existing relationship with Marvel. TSR hid the license as long as they could, using the internal codename "Boot Hill revision" to refer to the project, which was eventually released as Marvel Super Heroes (1984).

Marvel Super Heroes: The Heroic Role-Playing Game was written by Jeff Grubb and Steve Winter, with a scenario by Bruce Nesmith, and was published by TSR, Inc., in 1984 as a boxed set containing a 48-page book, two 16-page books, cardboard counters, a color map, and dice.

Reception
Allen Varney reviewed the initial game supplement in The Space Gamer #70. Varney commented that "this is a respectable effort, and an excellent introductory game for a devoted Marvel fan aged 10 to 12; older, more experienced, or less devoted buyers will probably be disappointed.  'Nuff said."

Ken Rolston reviewed Marvel Super Heroes for Dragon magazine #91 (November 1984). Rolston commented that "The mechanics are original and simple, the tone is practical and informal, and the presentation is direct and entertaining. [...] The game is much simpler than the Champions, Villains and Vigilantes, and Superworld games, and certainly a better choice for younger gamers. Confirmed supporters of these older systems will probably not be seduced by the clean rules design, having come to love the chains of their detailed and time-consuming character-generation systems."

Pete Tamlyn reviewed Marvel Super Heroes for Imagine magazine, and stated that "this game has been produced in collaboration with Marvel and that opportunity itself is probably worth a new game release. However, Marvel Superheroes is not just another Superhero game. In many ways it is substantially different from other SHrpgs."

Marcus L. Rowland reviewed Marvel Super Heroes: The Heroic Role-Playing Game for White Dwarf #62, rating it 8/10 overall. He stated that the game "features simple combat and power rules, good reasons for superheroes to spend time in their secret identities, and artwork based on the original comics", and stated, "Overall, the game rules and mechanics are simple and work reasonably well. Experienced referees may find the rules a little simplistic (for example, characters don't get tired or lose points while using powers, unless they expend Karma), but they certainly reflect the slamming action in most comics. Combat is resolved quickly, and the rules encourage role-playing as well as heroics." He concluded by declaring the initial boxed set "a useful system which is suitable for beginning players and referees, but should still suit experienced gamers".

Reviews
Adventurers Club #5 (Fall 1984 Digest)
Griffin #1 (Winter 1984-1985)
Different Worlds #38 (Jan/Feb 1985)
Game News #6 (Aug 1985)
Jeux & Stratégie #54

References

Marvel Comics role-playing game supplements
Role-playing game supplements introduced in 1984